Royal Quest is  fantasy themed massively multiplayer online role-playing game (MMORPG) developed by Katauri Interactive and 1C Online Games. Players are able to play in both player versus environment and player versus player modes within a fantasy and technology based world.

Development

The game was announced on October 22, 2010. Open beta of the Russian version has been launched April 10, 2012. Open beta of the English version was made available via Steam since August 4, 2014 (early access since July 31, 2014). Royal Quest has been officially released December 8, 2015 in Russia and December 23, 2015, in the world. 
Currently English version of the game is available via Steam, ARC and stand-alone client downloaded from the official website.

Story

Blossoming world of Aura, Golden Goddess, is endangered by vicious Black Alchemists, invaders from mysterious Terra. Hidden in their secret lairs they weave perfidious designs seeking to lay hold on resources of Elenium - rare and highly precious mineral of unusual nature and unique features - but also striving to obtain material for their unholy researches: human flesh and souls. Hideous chimeras are created of kidnapped victims' bodies and their souls bound with Elenium serve for prolonging Black Alchemists' unwholesome life. 

King Roland of Elenia, sprawling Human realm, calls everybody young, honest and brave to join his army preparing for last stand with malicious enemies of humankind and Aura herself. To arms heroes!

Classes

There is only one playable race in Royal Quest - Humans. Player can choose of four classes: Warrior, Archer, Rogue and Mage.

References

External links
 Official website of the English version

Massively multiplayer online role-playing games
2015 video games
1C Company games
Fantasy massively multiplayer online role-playing games
Video games developed in Russia
Multiplayer and single-player video games
Windows games
Windows-only games